Tiny and Toya is an American reality series starring Xscape singer-songwriter and the wife of rapper T.I., Tameka "Tiny" Cottle and rapper Lil Wayne's ex-wife Antonia "Toya" Wright. Upon its debut on June 28, 2009, on BET, the series drew in more than three million viewers, the highest-rated series debut in BET history. In October 2009, a second season of the series was confirmed. The premiere for the second season was broadcast on BET on April 13, 2010.

Episodes

Season 1 (2009)

Season 2 (2010)

References

External links
 Tiny and Toya Official Site
  
 The travails of Tiny and Toya

2000s American reality television series
2009 American television series debuts
2010s American reality television series
2010 American television series endings
BET original programming
African-American reality television series
English-language television shows
Television shows set in Atlanta